Colin Charles McCurdy (born 18 July 1954) is a Northern Irish former football player and manager.

Playing career
Born in Belfast, McCurdy played as a striker for Linfield, Cliftonville, Larne, Fulham, the Philadelphia Fury, Crusaders, Northcote City and Bangor. He also earned one cap for the Northern Ireland national team.

Coaching career
He later worked in various coaching and management roles at Bangor, Glenavon, the Irish FA, the Eastern Ontario District Soccer Association, and the Ottawa Fury.

References

1954 births
Living people
Association footballers from Northern Ireland
Northern Ireland international footballers
Linfield F.C. players
Cliftonville F.C. players
Larne F.C. players
Fulham F.C. players
Philadelphia Fury (1978–1980) players
Crusaders F.C. players
Bangor F.C. players
NIFL Premiership players
English Football League players
North American Soccer League (1968–1984) players
Association football forwards
Football managers from Northern Ireland
Bangor F.C. managers
Expatriate association footballers from Northern Ireland
Expatriate footballers in England
Expatriate soccer players in the United States
Expatriate sportspeople from Northern Ireland in the United States
Expatriate soccer managers in Canada
Expatriate sportspeople from Northern Ireland in Canada
Association football defenders
Northcote City FC players